Station Park may refer to:

 Station Park, Forfar, a football ground in Forfar, Scotland
 Station Park, Nairn, a football ground in Nairn, Scotland
 Station Park (Farmington, Utah), a commercial development in the United States which included the Farmington FrontRunner (commuter rail) station